The 102nd Squadron was a squadron of the 3rd Air Wing of the Japan Air Self-Defense Force (JASDF) based at Komaki Air Base in Aichi Prefecture, Japan. It was equipped with North American F-86D Sabre aircraft.

History
On March 1, 1959 the squadron was formed at Komaki Air Base. It was the JASDF's first frontline all-weather fighter squadron, as the 101st Squadron was a training squadron for most of its existence.

It was disbanded on December 1, 1967, on the same day as fellow Komaki unit, the 105th Squadron. At that time, the 101st through 105th Squadrons were F-86D squadrons.

Aircraft operated

Fighter aircraft
 North American F-86D Sabre（1958-1968）

See also
 Fighter units of the Japan Air Self-Defense Force

References

Units of the Japan Air Self-Defense Force